() was a luxury boat train of the Chemin de Fer du Nord and later SNCF.

See also

Eurostar – high-speed train service via the Channel Tunnel (since 1994)
Night Ferry – sleeper train between London and Paris/Brussels (1936–1980)
Silver Arrow (rail-air service) – intermodal passenger transport service between London and Paris (1956–c 1994)

References

External links

Named passenger trains of France
Railway services introduced in 1926